Ambrosio Zaldívar is a paralympic athlete from Cuba competing mainly in category T12 track events.

Ambrosio was part of the Cuban team to travel to the 1996 Summer Paralympics in Atlanta.  There he competed in the 1500m finishing seventh and won the gold medal n the T12 400m.

References

Paralympic athletes of Cuba
Athletes (track and field) at the 1996 Summer Paralympics
Paralympic gold medalists for Cuba
Living people
Medalists at the 1996 Summer Paralympics
Year of birth missing (living people)
Paralympic medalists in athletics (track and field)
Cuban male sprinters
Visually impaired sprinters
Paralympic sprinters
20th-century Cuban people